Púcuro is a corregimiento in Pinogana District, Darién Province, Panama with a population of 356 as of 2010. Its population as of 1990 was 358; its population as of 2000 was 295.  It lies along the Púcuro river, which is a tributary of the Tuira.

References

Corregimientos of Darién Province